The Counterintelligence Service or KOS was the counterintelligence service of the Yugoslav People's Army (JNA) that existed from 1946 until the breakup of Yugoslavia in 1991. In 1992, the Security Administration continued its work in Serbia and Montenegro.

Founding and structure 
KOS was formed in 1946 as one of the remnants of the Department for Protection of the People (OZNA), with State Security Administration (UDBA) forming the second, civilian, component of the new security and intelligence structure of SFR Yugoslavia. In 1955 changed its name to Security Administration and relocated from the General Staff to State Secretariat of People's Defence, later Federal Secretariat of Peoples Defence.

Activities 
Most information is still scant due to its classification as military secret, but some can be traced in the media, especially during the Milošević tenure and the role played in the break-up of SFRY (e.g. Operation Labrador).

See also 
 Department for Protection of the People (OZNA)
 State Security Administration (UDBA)
 Yugoslav People's Army
 Security Administration (FR Yugoslavia)

References

External links 
 International Criminal Tribunal for the former Yugoslavia, 'questioning' transcripts on Operations "Labrador" and "Opera". 
 KOS @ GlobalSecurity.org

1946 establishments in Yugoslavia
Government agencies established in 1946
1991 disestablishments in Yugoslavia
Government agencies disestablished in 1991
Yugoslav intelligence agencies
Socialist Federal Republic of Yugoslavia
Military intelligence agencies
Military of SFR Yugoslavia